Al-Quds is an Arabic name for Jerusalem, cognate with  sometimes also used in Judeo-Arabic.

Education
 Al-Quds Open University, an open university with campuses across the Palestinian territories, Saudi Arabia, and the United Arab Emirates
 Al-Quds University, the Palestinian university in Jerusalem

Islam
 Hadith Qudsi, a sub-category of Hadith, the sayings of Mohammed
 Tafsir Qudsi, a form of Quranic commentary

Palestinian – Israeli conflict
 Al-Quds rocket and Al Quds 3, rockets made by Palestinian Islamic Mujahedin
 Al-Quds Brigades, the armed wing of Palestinian Islamic Jihad (PIJ)
 International Day of Quds, a day commemorating Jerusalem

Journalism
 Al-Quds Al-Arabi, Arabic newspaper based in London
 Al-Quds (newspaper), a Palestinian newspaper
 Al-Quds (Ottoman period newspaper), an Ottoman period newspaper published in Jerusalem starting from 1908
 Quds News Network, a news agency in Palestine
 Hawliyat al-Quds, Arabic name for the Jerusalem Quarterly, a biannual journal published in Jerusalem

Organisations
 Al-Quds Mosque, in Hamburg, Germany
 Astan Quds Razavi, an organization administering the Imam Reza shrine and institutions
 Quds Force, a special unit of the Iranian Revolutionary Guards

Other uses
 Al-Quds Index, the primary stock index of the Palestine Securities Exchange
 Al-Quds machine gun, an Iraqi-made RPK machine gun

See also
 Qud (disambiguation)
 Jerusalem (disambiguation)

Arabic words and phrases

pl:Nazwy Jerozolimy#Al-Quds